Diogenes is a peer-reviewed academic journal that publishes papers four times a year in the field of philosophy and the humanities. The journal's editors are Maurice Aymard (Ecole des Hautes Etudes en Sciences Sociales) and Luca Maria Scarantino (IULM). It has been in publication since 1953 and is currently published by SAGE Publications on behalf of the International Council for Philosophy and Humanistic Studies (CIPSH), with the support of UNESCO.

Scope 
Diogenes aims to offer a publication outlet for scientific information and intellectual synthesis. The journal publishes work from all fields of philosophical, humanistic and social studies from archaeology to education. Diogenes is transdisciplinary in scope, publishing pieces by scholars across a range of disciplines.

Abstracting and indexing 
Diogenes is abstracted and indexed in the following databases:
 Academic Premier
 Arts & Humanities Citation Index
 Current Contents: Arts & Humanities
 Humanities Index
 Periodicals Content Index
 SCOPUS

References

 Diogenes SAGE Publications online portal to Diogenes.

External links 
 

SAGE Publishing academic journals
English-language journals
Philosophy journals
UNESCO